Mahamedkhabib Zaynudzinavich Kadzimahamedau or Magomedkhabib Zainudinovich Kadimagomedov (born 26 May 1994) is a Russian naturalized Belarusian freestyle wrestler. He is the Tokyo 2020 silver medallist in men's 74 kg, 2020 European Champion at 79kg and 2017 Russian National Champion at 70kg. He also placed seventh at the World Championships 2017. In 2020, he received citizenship of Belarus.

In 2020, he won one of the bronze medals in the men's 79 kg event at the 2020 Individual Wrestling World Cup held in Belgrade, Serbia. In March 2021, he competed at the European Qualification Tournament in Budapest, Hungary hoping to qualify for the 2020 Summer Olympics in Tokyo, Japan. Though he didn't qualify, he subsequently entered and won at the 2021 World Wrestling Olympic Qualification Tournament, qualifying for the Tokyo Olympics.  There he defeated 4x NCAA champion American Kyle Dake in the quarterfinals en route to earning a silver medal for Belarus.

Championships and accomplishments
Russian nationals 2017 – 1st at 70 kg.
Ivan Yarygin GP 2017 – 3rd at 70 kg.
Yasar Dogu International 2017 – 1st at 70 kg.
Stepan Sarkisyan International 2017 – 1st at 70 kg.
World Championships 2017 – 7th at 70 kg.
Belarusian nationals 2020 – 1st at 79 kg.
European champion 2020 – 1st at 79 kg.
 2020 Olympic Games - 2nd at 74 kg.

References

External links
 

1994 births
Living people
Belarusian male sport wrestlers
People from Tsumadinsky District
Russian male sport wrestlers
Russian Muslims
European Wrestling Championships medalists
Wrestlers at the 2020 Summer Olympics
Medalists at the 2020 Summer Olympics
Olympic silver medalists for Belarus
Olympic medalists in wrestling
European Wrestling Champions
Sportspeople from Dagestan
Olympic wrestlers of Belarus